The Crewe type locomotive was a series of designs of steam locomotive by Alexander Allan and William Buddicom during the 1840s.  It was widely copied elsewhere, particularly in France.

History
During the early 1840s Alexander Allan and William Buddicom of the Grand Junction Railway (GJR) created the design incorporating inclined outside cylinders and a double frame. It was built due to combat the frequent failure of crank axles on contemporary inside cylinder locomotive designs. The earliest examples were built by Buddicom at Chartreux for the Chemins de Fer de l'Ouest in 1844 where the type became known as 'Le Buddicom'.

The first British examples were built at Crewe Works in 1845 by the GJR and from 1846 by the GJR's successor, the London and North Western Railway (LNWR), with a 2-2-2 wheel arrangement for passenger classes and 2-4-0 for freight. 

The first of these GJR 2-2-2 locomotives, Columbine, is preserved at the Science Museum in London. It carried GJR fleet number 49, and was withdrawn from service in 1902 by the LNWR, carrying their number 1868.

These designs were widely copied by other railways both in the UK and overseas during the 1850s and 1860s.

References

Steam locomotive types
Railway locomotives introduced in 1844
2-2-2 locomotives
2-4-0 locomotives